Auntie's Fantasies is a 1941 Czech comedy film directed by Martin Frič.

Cast
 Růžena Nasková as Berta, aunt
 Ferenc Futurista as Hynek
 František Smolík as MUDr. Jelínek
 Theodor Pištěk as Eduard Svagrovský
 Jaroslav Marvan as Arnost Dusbaba, prokurista
 Růžena Šlemrová as Marenka Dusbabová
 Jiří Dohnal as Jindrich Dusbaba
 Miloš Nedbal as Cenek Felix
 Zdeňka Baldová as Felixová
 Lída Chválová as Slávka Felixová

References

External links
 

1941 films
1941 comedy films
Czechoslovak comedy films
1940s Czech-language films
Czech black-and-white films
Czechoslovak black-and-white films
Films directed by Martin Frič
1940s Czech films